Adele Logan Alexander is history professor at George Washington University and an author. She is known for her work on family history, gender, and social issues in African American families.

Education and career
Alexander graduated from Radcliffe College, her aunt's alma mater, in 1959. She earned her Ph.D. from Howard University in 1994, after beginning her doctoral work at age 46. She is a professor of American history at George Washington University. In 2009 she was named to the National Endowment for the Humanities.

Biography 
Alexander is an author known for her books on African American families, including notable members of her family which she chronicled in Princess of the Hither Isles: A Black Suffragist’s Story from the Jim Crow South about her grandmother the suffragist Adella Hunt Logan. In Homelands and Waterways: The American Journey of the Bond Family, 1846-1926, Alexander chronicles the transition from a working poor family to the middle class in the period from the Civil War to the Jazz Age. Her book Parallel Worlds describes the life of the diplomat William Henry Hunt and his wife Ida Gibbs who was a leading figure in the Pan-Africanism movement in the 1910s. In 1999 she was on the Charlie Rose show where she talked about racial identity and class. In 2020, Alexander was within a group of women talking with The New York Times about the 100-year mark of the Nineteenth Amendment to the United States Constitution, during the discussion she shared her thoughts on the actions taken by women to obtain the right to vote and her personal memories of going to vote with her mother as a young child.

Selected publications

Awards and honors 
In 2000, Alexander won the 2000 Black Caucus Literary Award from the American Library Association. In 2003, she received a lifetime achievement award from the African American Historical and Genealogical Society.

Personal life 
She married Clifford Alexander Jr. in 1959; he served as Secretary of the Army from 1977 until 1981. Their daughter, Elizabeth Alexander, is a poet and writer.

References

External links 
 , October 12, 2010
 , October 30, 2020

Living people
Radcliffe College alumni
Howard University alumni
George Washington University faculty
21st-century American women writers
20th-century American women writers
20th-century African-American writers
American women historians
21st-century American historians
Historians of African Americans
African-American historians
20th-century American historians
21st-century African-American writers
20th-century African-American women writers
21st-century African-American women writers
1938 births